In 2005, the Belgian newspaper, Het Nieuwsblad conducted a vote to discover the greatest Belgian of all time, under the title Belg der Belgen. The series is based on BBC's 100 Greatest Britons. On 1 December 2005, Father Damien (Jozef de Veuster) was chosen as Greatest Belgian of all time.

The top ten
Father Damien (1840–1889) (Catholic missionary)
Eddy Merckx (1945-) (cyclist)
Paul Janssen (1926–2003) (scientist)
Peter Paul Rubens (1577–1560) (painter)
Jacques Brel (1929–1978) (singer)
Jan Decleir (1946-) (actor)
Ernest Claes (1885–1968) (author)
René Magritte (1898–1967) (painter)
Adolphe Sax (1814–1894) (musical instrument designer)
Victor Horta (1861–1947) (architect)

Other editions

Other countries have produced similar shows; see Greatest Britons spin-offs

Greatest Nationals
Lists of Belgian people
2005 in Belgium